Bantow Srisukh (born 30 August 1946) is a Thai boxer. He competed in the men's light welterweight event at the 1972 Summer Olympics.

References

1946 births
Living people
Bantow Srisook
Bantow Srisook
Boxers at the 1972 Summer Olympics
Place of birth missing (living people)
Asian Games medalists in boxing
Boxers at the 1970 Asian Games
Bantow Srisook
Medalists at the 1970 Asian Games
Light-welterweight boxers
Bantow Srisook